The St. John's Red Storm men's basketball team represents St. John's University located in Queens, New York. The team participates in the Big East Conference. As of the end of the 2021–22 season, St. John's ranked ninth with 1,904 total wins among NCAA Division I teams. St. John's has appeared in 30 NCAA tournaments, most recently appearing in 2019. The Red Storm's best finish in the NCAA tournament came in 1952 when they were NCAA runner-ups and made the Final Four. St. John's also made a Final Four appearance in 1985. St. John's is coached by Mike Anderson.

History

Early years (1907–1927)
The St. John's men's basketball team played its first game on December 6, 1907, losing to New York University and registering its first win in program history against Adelphi University on January 3, 1908. Just three years later, the 1910–11 team were undefeated in a 14–0 season coached by former track and field Olympian Claude Allen, for which the team was later honored by the Helms Foundation and the Premo-Porretta Power Poll as national champions.

Buck Freeman era (1927–1936)

The Wonder Five
Twenty years later, former St. John's player James "Buck" Freeman was hired as coach. In his first four years, from 1927 to 1931, the team had a 85–8 record. The 1929–30 and 1930–31 teams were known as the "Wonder Five", made up of Matty Begovich, Mac Kinsbrunner, Max Posnack, Allie Schuckman, and Jack "Rip" Gerson, who together helped revolutionize the game of basketball and made St. John's the marquee team in New York City. On January 19, 1931, the Wonder Five team was a part of the first college basketball triple-header at Madison Square Garden in a charity game which saw St. John's beat CCNY by a score 17–9. Freeman finished his coaching career with a record of 177–31, an .850 winning percentage.

First Joe Lapchick era (1936–1947)
Joe Lapchick, a former player of the Original Celtics, took over as head coach at St. John's in 1936 and continued the success the school had become used to under Buck Freeman. Lapchick coached from 1936 to 1947 and again from 1956 to 1965. His Redmen teams won four NIT championships (1943, 1944, 1959, 1965). Lapchick preferred to take his teams to the more prestigious NIT instead of the NCAA tournament, making the NIT semifinals 8 out of a total 12 times, and only one NCAA tournament appearance in his 20 years of coaching the Redmen. Under Lapchick's coaching his teams also won six Metropolitan New York Conference regular season titles.

Back-to-back NIT Champions
On its way to its first of back-to-back NIT titles, St. John's had a record of 21–3 with only two losses occurring during the regular season. One was a 40–46 home loss to rival Niagara and another was a 38–42 loss at Madison Square Garden to Manhattan. The 1942–43 St. John's team were led by senior caption Andrew "Fuzzy" Levane and sophomore All-American center Harry Boykoff. The Redmen's trademark defense and inside scoring presence of Boykoff led them past Rice, Fordham, and Toledo to claim the first of six NIT titles. The season did not end after the NIT; three days later St. John's participated in the first Red Cross charity benefit game against NCAA champion Wyoming to determine a national champion. Wyoming won, 52–47.

St. John's became the first team to repeat as champions in the seven-year history of the NIT even though World War II and the players' commitment to serve in the armed forces made it a very difficult season. Harry Boykoff missed the 1943–44 and 1944–45 seasons due to being drafted for the war effort, along with the team's star point guard Dick McGuire for half the 1943–44 season and the entire following two years. Despite the losses of their star players, the St. John's team managed to finish the season with an 18–5 record and a second NIT crown by defeating Adolph Rupp's Kentucky Wildcats and Ray Meyer's DePaul Blue Demons. The Redmen were led by playmaking junior guards Hy Gotkin and Bill Kotsores, the latter of whom was selected as the 1944 NIT Most Valuable Player. For the second year in a row the Redmen participated in the Red Cross benefit game where they faced the NCAA champion Utah, and lost 36–44. The 1951 1952 team lost to Kentucky 81–40 in December 1951. In the NCAA tournament, St John's beat Kentucky, 64–57. They later finished second in the tournament to Kansas.

St. John's success continued the following year where they produced another 21–3 record, but their chance at a rematch with George Mikan's DePaul squad and a third consecutive NIT title was shattered with an upset loss to Bowling Green in the semifinals. They beat Rhode Island State for a third-place finish. Lapchick's Redmen made the NIT both of the next two years and added two more Metropolitan New York Conference regular season titles before heleft to take the head coaching job of the New York Knickerbockers in just the second year of their existence in the new Basketball Association of America, becoming the highest paid coach of the league at the time.

Frank McGuire era (1947–1952) 
Lapchick was succeeded by Frank McGuire, a former player under Buck Freeman, who made the postseason four out of five years as the coach and had an overall record of 102–36, culminating in a second-place finish in the 1952 NCAA Division I men's basketball tournament. Under McGuire, the Redmen reached an overall number one ranking in The Associated Press poll twice, won three Metropolitan New York Conference regular season titles, competed in four NITs and made their first appearance in the NCAA tournament where they made it to the Elite Eight before falling to eventual national champion Kentucky. They defeated North Carolina State for a regional third-place finish that year.

At the end of the season, McGuire left St. John's to become the basketball coach at the University of North Carolina at Chapel Hill. On paper, this was a significant step down from St. John's, as UNC was not reckoned as a national power at the time. However, school officials wanted a big-name coach to counter the rise of rival North Carolina State under Everett Case. McGuire's assistant coach, Al "Dusty" DeStefano, took over the head coaching duties of St. John's from 1952 to 1956. DeStefano's teams only made one postseason appearance and it was a 58–46 loss to the Seton Hall Pirates in the NIT Finals who were led by All-American center Walter Dukes. The following year, the Redmen had their first losing season in over 30 years.

Second Joe Lapchick era (1956–1965)
One month after leaving his position with the New York Knicks, Lapchick resumed his head coaching duties where he started and put St. John's back on its winning path. Picking up where he left off, he added two more NIT championships, made the postseason 6 out of 9 times, and finished wity an overall college coaching record of 334–130. In 20 years of coaching in the college ranks, Lapchick only had one losing season.

1959 & 1965 NIT Champions

St. John's finished the 1958–59 season with an overall 20–6 record and captured its first ECAC Holiday Festival title with a 90–79 victory over St. Joseph's in the final and the school's third NIT championship by defeating top-seeded Bradley 76–70 in double overtime. The starting five for the Redmen consisted of four seniors and sophomore sensation Tony Jackson who was named both the Holiday Festival and NIT Most Valuable Player during the 1958–59 season, setting a school record of 27 rebounds in one game. At the end of the season senior captain Alan Seiden was rewarded with second team All-American honors and the Haggerty Award, given to the best collegiate player in the New York metropolitan area. Throughout the next three years, St. John's went 58–18, led by Jackson who received All-American honors all three years at school, 6'11" center and future NBA champion LeRoy Ellis, and future ABA/NBA coach Kevin Loughery. In the 1961–62 season, St. John's made their fifth NIT finals appearance before falling to Dayton 73–67.

Lapchick went into the 1964–65 season knowing it would be his last year coaching at St. John's because he reached age 65, the mandatory retirement age of the university. His team began the year off by upsetting Cazzie Russell's Michigan Wolverines, the No. 1 team in the nation according to both the Associated Press and United Press International polls, by a score of 75–74 to capture the school's second ECAC Holiday Festival title. St. John's finished the season 21–8 and went on a remarkable run in the 1965 NIT by defeating Boston College, New Mexico, Army, and top-seeded Villanova to win Lapchick his fourth NIT championship. The Redmen were led by the rebounding of sophomore forward Lloyd "Sonny" Dove and the scoring of senior Ken McIntyre who totaled 101 points in his last four games, over 1,000 points for his college career, and being named the Most Valuable Player of both the Holiday Festival and the National Invitational Tournament.

Lou Carnesecca era (1965–1992)
Lou Carnesecca was hired as the head basketball coach at St. John's in 1965, after serving as an assistant at St. John's since 1958, and given the difficult task to follow in the footsteps of Lapchick. In the 1985 NCAA tournament, he coached the Redmen to their second Final Four appearance. He was named the National Coach of the Year in 1983 and 1985 and Big East Coach of the Year on three occasions. His record at St. John's was 526–200. Carnesecca led the team to its record fifth NIT title in 1989, to the NCAA's Elite Eight in 1979 and 1991, and to the Sweet Sixteen in 1967, 1969, and 1983.
Carnesecca temporarily left St. John's to coach in the ABA from 1970 to 1973, when it was coached by former player Frank Mulzoff, who gathered a record of 56–27 and three post-season appearances.  Upon Carnesecca's return, he continued to guide the program to 29 consecutive postseason tournament appearances and to playing in a major conference, the Big East.

1983 Big East Champions

1985 NCAA Final Four

1986 Big East Champions

Recent years (1992–present)

2000 Big East Champions

2003 NIT Champions

2010–11 Senior team

2011–12 Fresh Five team

Postseason

NCAA tournament results
The Red Storm have appeared in the NCAA tournament 30 times. Their combined record is 27–32. Due to impermissible benefits to a player, their 2002 appearance has been vacated by the NCAA making their official record 27–31.

* Vacated by the NCAA

NIT results
The Red Storm have appeared in the National Invitation Tournament (NIT) 30 times. Their combined record is 45–30. They are six-time NIT Champions (1943, 1944, 1959, 1965, 1989, 2003). Due to impermissible benefits to a player, their 2003 appearance (and title) has been vacated by the NCAA, making their official record 40–30.

* Vacated by the NCAA

Coaching history

St. John's rivalries

Big East rivalries

The St. John's-Georgetown rivalry was one of the most intense matchups in the Big East during the 1980s, highlighted by the 1985 Big East Championship, 1985 NCAA semifinal game, the "Sweater Game" between Hall of Fame coaches Lou Carnesecca and John Thompson, and Hall of Fame players Chris Mullin and Patrick Ewing. St. John's fans also count other East Coast rivals the Villanova Wildcats, Providence Friars, Seton Hall Pirates, and former Big East founders Syracuse Orange and the Boston College Eagles along with the Connecticut Huskies and Pittsburgh Panthers among their most frequently played opponents.

New York rivalries

St. John's fifth most frequent played opponent is fellow Vincentian and Western New York college, the Niagara Purple Eagles. The universities have played each other every college basketball season since 1909. St. John's also frequently plays other New York City opponents representing the four other NYC boroughs; the Fordham Rams and Manhattan Jaspers of The Bronx, the St. Francis Terriers and LIU Blackbirds of Brooklyn, the NYU Violets and CCNY Beavers of Manhattan, and the Wagner Seahawks of Staten Island. These teams were all instrumental in creating the postseason National Invitational Tournament hosted annually at Madison Square Garden. From 1933 to 1963 most of these schools came together to play each other in the Metropolitan New York Conference. The Red Storm own an all-time record of 250–86 against these other New York City schools.

St. John's program records

Career individual records

Season individual records

Game individual records

Notable players and coaches

Naismith Memorial Basketball Hall of Fame Members
The following St. John's players, coaches, and contributors have been enshrined in the Naismith Hall of Fame.

Players in the NBA since 1985

Players in International Basketball

Awards and honors

National award winners

Big East Conference award winners

Metropolitan Basketball Writers Association award winners

All-Metropolitan First Team

Harry Boykoff – 1943,'46
Larry Baxter – 1943
Andrew Levane – 1943
Dick McGuire – 1944,'49
Hy Gotkin – 1944,'45
David Russell – 1981,'82,'83
Chris Mullin – 1983,'84,'85
Bill Wennington – 1985
Walter Berry – 1985,'86
Mark Jackson – 1986,'87
Malik Sealy – 1990,'91,'92
Felipe Lopez – 1997,'98
Zendon Hamilton – 1997
Ron Artest – 1999
Erick Barkley – 1999,2000

Bootsy Thornton – 1999,2000
Lavor Postell – 2000
Omar Cook – 2001
Marcus Hatten – 2002,'03
Daryll Hill – 2005
Lamont Hamilton – 2007
Anthony Mason, Jr. – 2008
Paris Horne – 2009
D.J. Kennedy – 2009,'10
Dwight Hardy – 2011
Moe Harkless – 2012
D'Angelo Harrison – 2013,'14,'15
Sir'Dominic Pointer – 2015
Shamorie Ponds – 2017, '18, '19
Julian Champagnie - 2021, '22

McDonald's High School All-Americans
Wayne McKoy – 1977
Chris Mullin – 1981
Bill Wennington – 1981
Shelton Jones – 1984
Michael Porter – 1985
Malik Sealy – 1988
Robert Werdann – 1988
Felipe Lopez – 1994
Zendon Hamilton – 1994
Ron Artest – 1997
Erick Barkley – 1998
Omar Cook – 2000
Darius Miles – 2000
Elijah Ingram – 2002

Facilities

* record stands after the 2019–20 season

DeGray Gymnasium (1932–1956)
DeGray Gymnasium was the original home of the St. John's Redmen when the university was located at 75 Lewis Avenue in the Bedford-Stuyvesant section of Brooklyn, NY. Their record at DeGray Gym was 156 wins to 11 losses for a winning percentage of .934. St. John's played their last home game there on December 8, 1956 with a victory of Roanoke College 103-65. When the university was transitioning from Brooklyn to Queens, the basketball team split their home games between the old Madison Square Garden and Martin Van Buren High School for five seasons.

Carnesecca Arena (1961–present)

In 1961, home games were moved to the 5,602-seat Alumni Hall on the newly constructed Queens campus opening with a 79-65 win over George Washington University. On November 23, 2004 the building and court were renamed for Hall of Fame coach Lou Carnesecca.

Madison Square Garden (1931–present)

On January 19, 1931, St. John's was a part of the first college basketball triple-header at the third Madison Square Garden on 8th Avenue and 50th Street in a charity game which saw St. John's beat CCNY by a score 17–9. St. John's has played at least one game in the arena every year since then, for a record 89 consecutive seasons, for both regular season home games, preseason and postseason tournaments including the Big East, NIT, and Holiday Festival.

Taffner Field House
The current training facility of the St. John's basketball team is Taffner Field House, located on the Queens campus adjacent to Carnesecca Arena. In the fall of 2005, the $16 million facility was completed with a majority of the donations coming from longtime St. John's fan, graduate, and benefactor Donald L. Taffner and his wife Eleanor Taffner, for whom the building is named. The field house features four full-size basketball courts, two for student life and two for varsity basketball, a weight room, training room, locker rooms, meeting rooms, and coaching offices for both men's and women's basketball.

Key statistics

Victories over AP Number 1 Teams

St. John's has five victories over the AP number one ranked team.
 Jan. 11, 1951: No. 11 St. John's (NY) 68 vs. No. 1 Bradley 59 @ Madison Square Garden
 Mar. 22, 1952: No. 10 St. John's (NY) 64 vs. No. 1 Kentucky 57 @ Reynolds Coliseum
 Jan. 2, 1965: NR St. John's (NY) 75 vs. No. 1 Michigan 74 @ Madison Square Garden
 Dec. 30, 1978: NR St. John's (NY) 69 vs. No. 1 Duke 66  @ Madison Square Garden
 Jan. 26, 1985: No. 2 St. John's (NY) 66 vs. No. 1 Georgetown 65 @ Capital Centre
 Feb. 7, 2018: NR St. John's (NY) 79 vs. No. 1 Villanova 75 @ Wells Fargo Center

References

External links
 Official Website

 
Basketball teams established in 1907
1907 establishments in New York City